The Patagonian Social Party (PSP) is a provincial political party in the Tierra del Fuego Province of Argentina. It was founded by then-governor Fabiana Ríos in 2010 as a splinter from ARI. Although Ríos was re-elected in 2011, the PSP has failed to gain much electoral success on its own since then. The party supported the successful 2019 gubernatorial candidacy of Gustavo Melella.

The party presently counts with representation in the Argentine Chamber of Deputies, as one of its members, Carolina Yutrovic, took office in the lower chamber in replacement of Martín Perez, who resigned to become intendente of Río Grande. Yutrovic was elected as deputy in her own right in 2021.

Electoral results

Chamber of Deputies

Senate

Tierra del Fuego governorship

Tierra del Fuego provincial legislature

Notes

References

External links
Official website (in Spanish)

Provincial political parties in Argentina
Political parties established in 2010
2010 establishments in Argentina